Mayeh Darrahsi (also Romanized as Māyeh Darrahsī) is a village in Qeshlaq-e Sharqi Rural District, Qeshlaq Dasht District, Bileh Savar County, Ardabil Province, Iran. At the 2006 census, its population was 50, in 8 families.

References 

Towns and villages in Bileh Savar County